NASA's Airborne Science Program is administered from the NASA Neil A. Armstrong Flight Research Center, in Edwards, California. The program supports the sub-orbital flight requirements of NASA's Earth Science Enterprise. Dryden maintains and operates two ER-2 high-altitude "satellite simulator" aircraft and a DC-8 which is specially configured as a "flying laboratory".

The scientific disciplines that employ these aircraft include Earth sciences, astronomy, atmospheric chemistry, climatology, oceanography, archeology, ecology, forestry, geography, geology, hydrology, meteorology, volcanology and biology. The DC-8 and ER-2 are also important tools for the development of sensors intended to fly aboard future Earth-observing satellites, and to validate and calibrate the sensors which are used onboard satellites which currently orbit the Earth.

NASA research aircraft types operated

Present

Media

See also 
Center for Earth Resources Observation and Science

References

External links 
 

NASA programs
Articles containing video clips